Anthony Graeme Pollock (born 7 April 1973) is a South African cricketer. He was born in Port Elizabeth, Cape Province and is the son of Graeme Pollock and cousin of the all-rounder Shaun Pollock. His brother Andrew also played for Transvaal and Gauteng.

External links
 

1973 births
Living people
South African cricketers
Gauteng cricketers
Easterns cricketers
Northerns cricketers
Alumni of King Edward VII School (Johannesburg)
Leicestershire Cricket Board cricketers
South African people of Scottish descent